The Moyer Row Houses are two historic two-story row houses in Omaha, Nebraska. They were built in 1904, and designed in the Renaissance Revival architectural style. They have been listed on the National Register of Historic Places since March 12, 2008.

References

External links

National Register of Historic Places in Omaha, Nebraska
Renaissance Revival architecture in Nebraska
Houses completed in 1904